Karl Pohlig (10 February 1864 – 17 June 1928) was a German Bohemian conductor born in Teplitz, Bohemia, Austrian Empire. He studied cello and piano in Weimar, and later taught piano there. In 1901 in Stuttgart he became the first conductor to perform the complete version of Bruckner's Symphony No. 6. This symphony had been performed before in excerpts and in an edited-down version by Gustav Mahler.

Pohlig became conductor of the Philadelphia Orchestra from 1907 to 1912. He invited Sergei Rachmaninoff to make his U.S. debut with the orchestra in 1909. In 1912, he resigned in disgrace after the revelation that he was involved in an extramarital affair with his Swedish secretary. However, Pohlig also sued the orchestra for breach of contract, as he had one year remaining on his contract at that time. He received a settlement of one year's salary. Pohlig concluded his career as conductor of the Braunschweig court opera in Germany, the city in which he died.

References

External links 
 A Thoroughly Modern Orchestra
 Wissens-Portal (German-language page), listing birth and death dates

Austrian conductors (music)
Male conductors (music)
American people of German Bohemian descent
German emigrants to the United States
German Bohemian people
People from Teplice
Musicians from Philadelphia
Music directors of the Philadelphia Orchestra
1864 births
1928 deaths
19th-century German musicians
19th-century male musicians